Tecumseh  is a town in Essex County in Southwestern Ontario, Canada. It is on Lake St. Clair east of Windsor and had a population of 23,229 at the 2016 census. It is part of the Windsor census metropolitan area, and is a part of the Windsor-Essex County region along with Amherstburg, Kingsville, Lakeshore, LaSalle and Leamington. Tecumseh was originally a Franco-Ontarian settlement.

Food processing is a major industry in Tecumseh, as Bonduelle owns a food processing plant near the town. The plant was built by Green Giant in 1931. Green Giant sold the plant in the late 1990s to Family Tradition Foods, who sold it to Carrière Foods in 2006. Carrière Foods was purchased in 2007 by Bonduelle.

The Tecumseh Corn Festival has been recognized as one of the Top 50 Festivals in Ontario by Festivals and Events Ontario.

Tecumseh is surrounded by Lake Erie, Lake St. Clair and the Detroit River. Detroit is easily accessible to Tecumseh residents by the Ambassador Bridge or the Detroit–Windsor Tunnel, both of which are located within the neighbouring municipality of Windsor.

The town is named after Tecumseh, an 18th-century Shawnee chief and warrior who promoted resistance to the expansion of the United States onto Native American lands.

History

The building of St.Anne’s church on the corner of Lesperance and Tecumseh Road in 1858 was the start of the Village of Tecumseh. Settled by a few French families of they Detroit River. Land Grants to Charles Lesperance in 1796 from the British Administrators of the District of Hess is Tecumseh’s start. Later the building of the Great Western Railway brought job seekers and more settlement. The town became an important railway depot and stopover for travellers. County residents took horse and buggy into Tecumseh and then transferred onto the train, journeying by rail the rest of the way into Windsor. Several hotels were established in Tecumseh to accommodate travellers. The Bedell Hotel, the Soulliere Inn, the Hebert and the Hotel Perreault were some of the places most frequented by travellers and locals alike.

The French were the original settlers of Tecumseh, the majority of them descendants of the Frenchmen who had lived in the area before the arrival of British administrators after the Paris Peace Agreement in 1763. Those that had been living on their River farms kept them. Today the street names from Ouellette Ave in Windsor to Lesperance Road in Tecumseh are a reminder of the men that cleared the land and farmed it.

As the town of Windsor grew, the overflow of immigrants settled in Tecumseh and other peripheral regions. Indicative of the change was the mix-up created by the introduction of the tomato to the area of Tecumseh. The first post office was opened in 1870, located on the northeast corner of Tecumseh and Lesperance Roads.  Called Ryegate Station, its first Postmaster was a Mr. Christie.  It was renamed "Tecumseh" in November 1875. Some of the first businesses in Tecumseh included a lumber mill operated by J.B. Cada; a grocery store operated by Arthur Cecile; a cheese factory on Banwell Road operated by Joseph Breault; a bakery owned by John Dugell; three butcher shops; a canning factory and a brewery eventually closed under Carling Brewery. In 1921 it was felt that Tecumseh was not getting its fair share of improvements in proportion to the taxes paid to the municipality of Sandwich East. A group of people headed by Malcolm Clapp petitioned the legislature to separate from the township and incorporate as the Town of Tecumseh with a population of 978. Dr. Paul Poisson was appointed as the first mayor of the town. The real growth in Tecumseh occurred in 1931 with the establishment of the Green Giant Factory as Fine Foods of Canada. Green Giant (now Bonduelle) is still located in Tecumseh and continues to employ full and part-time workers.

As the population grew, so did the demands for services. In 1922 a fire chief was appointed although no fire department was in existence, the fires were fought by town volunteers. The Ontario Provincial Police started policing the town in 1948 with 2 officers.

In 1999, as part of a reorganization of Essex County, Tecumseh was merged with the Village of St. Clair Beach, and the Township of Sandwich South into the Town of Tecumseh. Now considered to be a bedroom community of Windsor, Tecumseh is often cited as an example of urban sprawl; new subdivisions have developed on some of Canada's most valuable agricultural land beginning in the late 1980s.

Communities
Besides the town proper of Tecumseh itself, the town of Tecumseh comprises a number of villages and hamlets, including Fairplay, Maidstone, Oldcastle, Paquette, Paquette Corners (partially) and St. Clair Beach (formerly from Maidstone Township).

Governance

Town Council 
The 2018 Municipal Election in the Town of Tecumseh, which took place on October 22, had a voter turnout of 37.43%. The official results for the municipal election were signed off by Laura Moy, Director of Corporate Services/Clerk for the Town of Tecumseh.

 Mayor: Gary McNamara 
 Deputy Mayor: Joe Bachetti 
 Ward 1: Andrew Dowie 
 Ward 2: William Altenhof 
 Ward 3: Rick (Rico) Tonial 
 Ward 4: Brian Houston 
 Ward 5: Tania Jobin

The positions of Mayor, Ward 1 Councillor, Ward 2 Councillor, and Ward 5 Councillor were all acclaimed.

Demographics

The median household income in 2005 for Tecumseh was $90,206, which is above the Ontario provincial average of $60,455. Most of the population is of Franco-Ontarian descent.

Mother tongue:
 English only 	17,535
 French only 	1,915
 English and French 	1,734
 Other language(s) 	3,040

Aboriginal population:
 Aboriginal identity population 	  364  	
 Non-Aboriginal identity population 	23,860

Visible minority population characteristics:
 Chinese 	200  	
 South Asian 	460  	
 Black   	55  	
 Filipino 	210  	
 Latin American 	105
 Southeast Asian 87 	
 West Asian  	15  	
 Visible minority, n.i.e. 	35  	
 Multiple visible minority 	10  	
 Not a visible minority 	        22,805

Population Distributed by Age (%):

 0 to 14 years 	15.2%
 15 to 64 years 	 65.6%
 65 years and older 	 19.2%
 85 years and older 	 2.2%

The average age in Tecumseh is 43.4 years old.

Infrastructure

Schools

French Catholic Schools:
 École élémentaire catholique Saint-Antoine – 1317 Lesperance Road, Tecumseh, Ontario
 École élémentaire catholique Sainte-Marguerite d'Youville – 13025 St Thomas Street, Tecumseh, Ontario
 École secondaire catholique l'Essor – 13605 St. Gregory's Road, Tecumseh, Ontario

French Immersion Catholic School:
 St. André French Immersion Catholic Elementary School – 13765 St. Gregory Road, Tecumseh, Ontario

French Immersion Public School:
 Tecumseh Vista Academy/Académie – 11665 Shields Street, Tecumseh, Ontario

English Public Schools:
 A. V. Graham Public Elementary School – 815 Brenda Cr, Tecumseh, Ontario 
 D. M. Eagle Public Elementary School – 14194 Tecumseh Rd. Tecumseh, Ontario

English Catholic Schools:
 St. Pius X Catholic Elementary School – 644 Lacasse Boulevard, Tecumseh, Ontario
 Saint Peter Catholic Elementary School – 2451 St Alphonse Rd, Tecumseh, Ontario
 St. Mary's Catholic Elementary School – 12048 County Rd 34, Maidstone, Ontario

Private Schools:
 Académie Ste-Cécile International School – 12021 Tecumseh Rd. East, Tecumseh, Ontario
 Lakeview Montessori School – 13797 Riverside Drive, Tecumseh, Ontario

Transit
Tecumseh Transit is the municipal bus service, operated by First Student Canada, which commenced on December 21, 2009.
A connection has been made to Transit Windsor services at Tecumseh Mall. The Tecumseh Transit service covers 30 kilometres and 43 stops, and operates using two buses.

Culture

Tourism and events
Tecumseh hosts many special events throughout the year.
Art of Eating Festival
Christmas in Tecumseh (Taking place on November 23, 2018)

It is also home to the Tecumseh Historical Museum (a.k.a. Tecumseh Heritage Centre) run by the Tecumseh Area Historical Society (TAHS).

Sports

Tecumseh is home to the St. Clair Green Giants of the Great Lakes Summer Collegiate League and play at Lacasse Park.

Notable residents
Joseph Groulx, French-language storyteller
Zack Kassian, professional hockey player
Pawel Kruba, CFL player
Chris Lori, Olympic bobsledder
Kerby Rychel, professional hockey player
Dave Steen, Olympic bronze medal-winning decathlete
Eric Wellwood, professional hockey player
Kyle Wellwood, professional hockey player
Former NHL players Mark Renaud, Tim Kerr, Bob Boughner, Warren Rychel, Adam Graves, Ernie Godden and Bob Probert

Environment

Climate 
Average Temperatures (°C)

High and Low

January: -0.06 and -8.17

February: 1.28 and -7.33

March: 6.56 and -2.94

April: 14.50 and 2.94

May: 20.61 and 8.33

June: 26.33 and 14.00

July: 28.56 and 16.17

August: 27.78 and 15.28

September: 23.78 and 11.28

October: 17.83 and 5.61

November: 8.78 and 0.17

December: 1.89 and -5.83

Flooding 
Recent changes in global climate have caused increased flooding activity through Windsor-Essex, impacting Tecumseh directly. Two major flooding events occurred in 2016 and 2017, resulting in 190 millimetres and 140–200mm of rainfall respectively. During the 2016 flood, over 1500 homes in Tecumseh reported flood damage. The 2017 flood, according to Environment Canada, was the most expensive storm across Canada during 2017, with an insurance payouts totalling $154 million. States of emergencies were called by the Mayor of Tecumseh, as well as the Mayor of Windsor, due to the overwhelming amount of rain that accumulated within the area over such a short period of time.

Parks 
Tecumseh has over 40 parks throughout the municipality, including Lacasse Park, Green Acres Park, and Lakewood Park, which includes a disc golf course which was opened in 2016. The Town maintains 200 acres of parkland within the municipality. The town is also home to the membership-exclusive 18 hole golf course owned by Beach Grove Golf and Country Club.

Sister towns

  Oldcastle, County Meath, Ireland (April 23, 2009)
 Frosinone, Italy (May 2009)
 Tecumseh, Michigan, United States (January 19, 2013)

See also
List of townships in Ontario

References

External links

Lower-tier municipalities in Ontario
Municipalities in Essex County, Ontario
Lake St. Clair
Ontario populated places on Lake St. Clair
Towns in Ontario
Populated places established in 1792
1792 establishments in Canada